Mehran Kushk (also Romanized as Mehrān Kūshk; also known as Mīrān Kush) is a village in Baghestan Rural District, in the Eslamiyeh District of Ferdows County, South Khorasan Province, Iran. At the 2006 census, its population was 418, in 139 families.

References 

Populated places in Ferdows County